Sophie and Magaly was a French musical duo composed of twin sisters Sophie (24 August 1962 – 27 February 2019) and Magaly Gilles-Giovannoni (24 August 1962 – 2 April 1996). The duo are best known for representing Luxembourg in the Eurovision Song Contest 1980 with the song "Papa Pingouin", placing ninth. However, the song was a commercial success in France, where over one million copies of the single were sold. Their second single, "Arlequin", sold poorly, and their German producer Ralph Siegel of the label Ariola dropped them from the label shortly thereafter. Producer Charles Talar subsequently gave them a second chance, however, their follow-up singles "Toi" and "Les nanas de Zorro" were equally unsuccessful, and the group disbanded shortly thereafter.

In the late 1980s, Magaly contracted HIV, and  died of AIDS in April 1996. Sophie suffered from high depressive syndrome and lived in the south of France. She died in 2019.

Discography 

 1980 - "Papa Pingouin"
 1980 - "Arlequin"
 1980 - "Tous les enfants du monde"
 1981 - "Les Nanas de Zorro"
 1981 - "Poupée qui chante, poupée que pleure"
 1981 - "Toi"
 1981 - "Tous les enfants chantent Noël"

References

External links 
 Sophie and Magaly's discography
 Sophie and Magaly tribute on J. P. Cara's website

French musical duos
Eurovision Song Contest entrants for Luxembourg
Eurovision Song Contest entrants of 1980
French twins
Twin musical duos
Female twins
Female musical duos